The Kanto Pro Championship was a professional golf tournament in Japan . It was first played in 1931 and was an event on the Japan Golf Tour from 1973 to 1990. It was played in July at a variety of courses in Eastern Japan, mainly in the Kantō region.

Winners
this list is incomplete
1990 Tsuneyuki Nakajima
1989 Saburo Fujiki
1988 Tomohiro Maruyama
1987 Naomichi Ozaki
1986 Tsuneyuki Nakajima
1985 Tsuneyuki Nakajima
1984 Pete Izumikawa
1983 Isao Aoki
1982 Motomasa Aoki
1981 Seiichi Kanai
1980 Akira Yabe
1979 Isao Aoki
1978 Isao Aoki
1977 Kenji Mori
1976 Takashi Murakami
1975 Hsieh Min-Nan
1974 Isao Aoki
1973 Masashi Ozaki
1972 Isao Aoki
1971 Isao Aoki
1970 Fujio Ishii
1969 Haruo Yasuda
1968 Torakichi Nakamura
1967 Seiichi Sato
1966 Hideyo Sugimoto
1965 Fujio Ishii
1964 Chen Ching-Po
1963 Koichi Ono
1962 Koichi Ono
1961 Torakichi Nakamura
1960 Torakichi Nakamura
1959 Koichi Ono
1958 Koichi Ono
1957 Haruyoshi Kobari
1956 Chen Sei Sui
1955 Haruyoshi Kobari
1954
1953 Yoshiro Hayashi
1952
1951 Seiji Inoue
1950
1949 Son Shi Kin
1948 Yoshiro Hayashi
1944–47 No championship due to World War II
1943
1942
1941
1940
1939
1938
1937
1936 Rokuzo Asami
1935 Chin Sei Sui
1934 Chin Sei Sui
1933 Kanekichi Nakamura
1932 Kanekichi Nakamura
1931 Rokuzo Asami

External links
Coverage on Japan Golf Tour's official site

Former Japan Golf Tour events
Defunct golf tournaments in Japan
Recurring sporting events established in 1931
Recurring sporting events disestablished in 1990
1931 establishments in Japan
1990 disestablishments in Japan